Dagmara Kutliková (born 20 February 1978) is a Slovak weightlifter, competing in the 53 kg category. She represented Slovakia at international competitions. 

She competed at the 2011 World Weightlifting Championships, and 2012 European Weightlifting Championship.

References 

Slovak female weightlifters
Living people

1978 births